The Hungarian Yachting Association is the national governing body for the sport of sailing in Hungary, recognised by the International Sailing Federation.

Famous Sailors
See :Category:Hungarian sailors

Olympic sailing
See :Category:Olympic sailors of Hungary

Yacht Clubs
See :Category:Yacht clubs in Hungary

References

External links
 Official website

Hungar
Sailing